Léon Spilliaert (also Leon Spilliaert; 28 July 1881 – 23 November 1946) was a Belgian symbolist painter and graphic artist.

Biography
Spilliaert was born in Ostend, the oldest of seven children of Léonard-Hubert Spilliaert, a perfumer, and his wife Léonie (née Jonckheere). From childhood, he displayed an interest in art and drawing. A prolific doodler and autodidact, he was predominantly a self-taught artist. Sickly and reclusive, he spent most of his youth sketching scenes of ordinary life and the Belgian countryside.

When he was 21, Spilliaert went to work in Brussels for Edmond Deman, a publisher of the works of symbolist writers, which Spilliaert was to illustrate. He especially admired the work of Edgar Allan Poe.

Watercolor, gouache, pastel, and charcoal—often in combination—were the means by which he produced many of his best works, among which are a number of monochrome self-portraits executed in the early years of the twentieth century. Spilliaert's expressive use of black finds parallels in the work of Odilon Redon, who was a significant influence. Frequently depicting a lone figure in a dreamlike space, Spilliaert's paintings convey a sense of melancholy and silence.

His later work shows a concentration on seascapes. He died on 23 November 1946 in Brussels.

Honours 
 1922 – Knight of the Order of the Crown.

Work
Among the best-known works of Léon Spilliaert are the images Digue la nuit and Clair de Lune et Lumières. Both works are in the Musée d'Orsay in Paris.

Most of Spilliaert's works are marked by an oppressive alien and elegiac atmosphere. In Digue la nuit (1908), the painter removes any naturalistic characteristics of the landscape depicted in the image and creates a stylization in which the location, that serves as a template, is redesigned to become the mirror of a state of mind. Solitude, mystery, and hallucination are suggested by the landscape.

In Clair de Lune et Lumières (c. 1909), the colonnade and arcades of the façade of the Kursaal ballroom on the seawall in Ostend served Spilliaert as a basis for the composition of an urban landscape. In this pastel painting, he catches the eerie transformation of the architecture at night and the strangeness that comes from artificial lighting. With its cosmic, metaphysical traits Clair de Lune et Lumières reveals the influence of Van Gogh, and is reminiscent of The Starry Night.

In the period 1902–1909, Spilliaert concentrated on creating complex, profound self-portraits of introspective nature. His 1903 self-portrait (Portrait de l'artiste par lui-même) is a dramatic self-presentation with ghostly apparitions in the background and a wry face in three-quarter pose. This image can be identified as a prototype for the three-quarter-portraits Spilliaert created later.

Legacy 

Ian Wilson's Spilliaert's Beach, for violin and piano, was inspired by and named for the painting Moonlight Beach.

References
Notes

Citations

Bibliography
 
 
 This text fully copied and surprisingly only signed by Anne Adriaens-Pannier on the coverbook: Anne Adriaens-Pannier & Alain Jacobs(author of text) : "Léon Spilliaert : de verzameling van de Koninklijke Bibliotheek van België = la collection de la Bibliothèque Royale de Belgique", Antwerpen : Pandora Publishers NV , 2018. This edition accompanies the exhibition "Léon Spilliaert. De verzameling van de Koninklijke Bibliotheek van België" in The Venetiaanse Gaanderijen van 30 juni tot 30 September 2018.

External links
 Fabritius gallery – A large collection of work in the database of the Royal Museums of Fine Arts of Belgium (French)
 Infographic about life and work of Léon Spilliaert
 Works of Spilliaert in the catalogue of the Royal Museums of Fine Arts of Belgium in Brussels (French)
 Works of Spilliaert in the catalogue of the Musée d'Orsay in Paris

1881 births
1946 deaths
20th-century Belgian painters
Belgian Symbolist painters
Belgian graphic designers
Artists from Ostend